Freyming-Merlebach is a commune in the Moselle department in Grand Est in north-eastern France. It is part of the agglomeration of Saarbrücken and Forbach.

Population

See also
 Communes of the Moselle department

References

External links
 

Fremingmerlebach